The iTunes media platform was first released by Apple in 2001 as a simple music player for Mac computers. Over time, iTunes developed into a sophisticated multimedia content manager, hardware synchronization manager and e-commerce platform. iTunes was finally discontinued for new Mac computers in 2019, but is still available and supported for Macs running older operating systems and for Windows computers to ensure updated compatibility for syncing with new releases of iOS devices (refer to Devices section).

iTunes enables users to manage media content, create playlists, synchronize media content with handheld devices including the iPod, iPhone, and iPad, re-image and update handheld devices, stream Internet radio and purchase music, films, television shows, and audiobooks via the iTunes Store.

History 

Apple based the initial release of iTunes on SoundJam MP, a program developed by Bill Kincaid and released by Casady & Greene in 1999. Apple purchased the program from Casady & Greene in 2000. At the time of the purchase, Kincaid, Jeff Robbin and Dave Heller left Casady & Greene to continue development of the program as Apple employees. At Apple, the developers simplified SoundJam's user interface, added the ability to burn CDs, and removed the program's recording feature and skin support.

Apple released version 1.0 of the program under a new name "iTunes" on January 9, 2001 at Macworld San Francisco. Macintosh users immediately began poking through iTunes's resource fork, where they discovered numerous strings and other resources that indicated that iTunes was a re-engineered Sound Jam MP. Casady & Greene ceased distribution of SoundJam MP on June 1, 2001 at the request of the developers.

Originally a Mac OS 9-only application, iTunes began to support Mac OS X with the release of version 1.1 in March 2001. Release 2.0 added support for the new iPod. Version 3 dropped Mac OS 9 support but added smart playlists and a ratings system. In April 2003, version 4.0 introduced the iTunes Store; in October, version 4.1 added support for Microsoft Windows 2000 and Windows XP. Introduced at Macworld 2005 with the new iPod Shuffle, Version 4.7.1 introduced the ability to convert higher-bitrate songs to 128kbit/s AAC automatically, as these devices did not natively support audio encoded in AIFF or Apple Lossless formats, also improving the value proposition of the Shuffle's limited flash-only storage. Version 7.0 introduced gapless playback and Cover Flow in September 2006. In March 2007, iTunes 7.1 added support for Windows Vista, and 7.3.2 was the last Windows 2000 version.

iTunes lacked support for 64-bit versions of Windows until the 7.6 update on January 16, 2008. iTunes is currently supported under any 64-bit version of Windows, although the iTunes executable was still 32-bit until version 12.1. The 64-bit versions of Windows XP and Windows Server 2003 are not supported by Apple, but a workaround has been devised for both operating systems. Version 8.0 added Genius playlists, grid view, and a new default visualizer.

iTunes 9 added "Home Share" enabling automatic updating of purchased items across other computers on the same subnet and offers a new iTunes Store . Genius Mixes were added, as well as improved App synchronization abilities, extending the iPod Shuffle 128 kbit/s down-convert feature to all of Apple's AAC-capable devices. It also adds iTunes LPs to the store, which gives additional media with an album. Apple added iTunes Extras as well to the store, which adds content usually reserved for films on DVD and Blu-ray discs. Both iTunes LPs and Extras use web-standards HTML, JavaScript, and CSS.

On September 1, 2010, Apple held their annual music press event where they unveiled an updated version: iTunes 10. The new version was available for download later that day. One major feature includes the integration of "iTunes Ping", which brings a social factor to the iTunes experience. Apple CEO Steve Jobs also announced a new logo, one without a CD in the background because of the increasing popularity of iTunes digital downloads.

In October 2012, Apple announced the launch of the iPhone 5 and iPad Mini, the refresh of the iPod and Mac lines, and the upcoming release of iTunes 11. Slated for release by the end of October, the launch was pushed back to November 29, 2012. This version included tighter integration with iCloud, and a new user interface. Users' libraries now include all media they have stored in their iCloud account, along with any media unique to the device they are using. Media files stored in the cloud don't need to be downloaded before playing, allowing a larger collection to be accessible without increased disk usage. The new user interface includes a refreshed grid view, which replaces Cover Flow as the default layout method. With this change, Cover Flow is no longer available within the application. With the release of this software, the iTunes Store was redesigned to remain consistent with the new interface, and the stores available on iOS devices. The social element Ping was also removed and replaced by increased Twitter and Facebook integration. Other minor changes included disabling the sidebar by default, and slightly altering the icon to match that of the Mac App Store better.

On October 16, 2014, Apple released iTunes 12, with a redesigned icon and interface, inspired by OS X Yosemite. With iTunes 12.1 and later, there is a new widget for notification center in OS X Yosemite, which allows the user to see what's playing, skip ahead, and even buy songs from iTunes Radio, right from notification center. It also improves performance when syncing to an iOS device.

iTunes has been credited with accelerating shifts within the music industry. The pricing structure of iTunes encouraged the sale of single songs, allowing users to abandon the purchase of more expensive albums. This hastened the end of the Album Era in popular music.

On April 26, 2018, Apple released iTunes 12 for Windows 10 via the Windows Store. The Universal Windows Platform app retains all features available in the desktop version, but will be updated and available through the Windows Store.

On June 3, 2019, Apple stated that they would no longer include iTunes with future Mac computers. Starting with the operating system macOS Catalina, Apple instead split iTunes into separate apps: Apple Music, Apple TV, and Apple Podcasts. iTunes continues to be available on Windows and on macOS operating systems prior to Catalina. Users can also still install iTunes versions 10, 11, and 12 on macOS Catalina and macOS Big Sur using the Retroactive app.

Compatibility

Operating system versions 

 iTunes Store requires at least version 11, dropping support for earlier versions.
 On May 25, 2018, Apple dropped support for Windows XP and Vista, no longer allowing new purchases or re-downloading of previous purchases.
 On June 30, 2018, TLS 1.0 was discontinued, affecting devices on iOS 4.3.5, OS X 10.8.5 Mountain Lion and earlier. The minimum version able to manage accounts & edit payment information are iTunes 12.6.4 (released in April 2018) and 12.7.5 (released in May 2018).
 Although new versions of iTunes have not been released for macOS since May 2019, compatibility with new iOS releases (iOS 13, 14) have been backported to iTunes 12.8.2 (for OS X 10.11 El Capitan, macOS 10.12 Sierra, 10.13 High Sierra) and 12.9.5 (for macOS 10.14 Mojave).
 iTunes on Windows Home Server may cause data corruption, which Microsoft fixed in an update.
 iTunes usually requires latest service pack or point release to function.
 a. Mac OS 9.1 is required to burn CDs.
 b. iTunes supports both 32-bit and 64-bit editions for Windows Vista, 7, 8, 8.1, and 10. iTunes does not support 64-bit editions of Windows XP.

Devices

Version history

iTunes 1

iTunes 2

iTunes 3

iTunes 4

iTunes 5

iTunes 6

iTunes 7

iTunes 8

iTunes 9

iTunes 10

iTunes 11

iTunes 12

See also 
 iTunes
 iTunes Store
 iOS version history
 Safari version history

References

External links 
  – official site at Apple

Timeline
iTunes